Branislav Simić (born 21 March 1935) is a retired Greco-Roman wrestler from Serbia. He competed at the 1956, 1964 and 1968 Olympics in the middleweight category (−87 kg), and won a gold medal in 1964 and a bronze in 1968.

References

External links
 

Serbian male sport wrestlers
Wrestlers at the 1956 Summer Olympics
Wrestlers at the 1964 Summer Olympics
Wrestlers at the 1968 Summer Olympics
Yugoslav male sport wrestlers
Olympic wrestlers of Yugoslavia
Olympic gold medalists for Yugoslavia
Olympic bronze medalists for Yugoslavia
1935 births
Living people
Olympic medalists in wrestling
People from Gornja Rogatica
World Wrestling Championships medalists
Medalists at the 1968 Summer Olympics
Medalists at the 1964 Summer Olympics
Mediterranean Games gold medalists for Yugoslavia
Competitors at the 1967 Mediterranean Games
Mediterranean Games medalists in wrestling